Emory Conrad Malick (December 29, 1881 – January 23, 1959) was an aviation pioneer from the state of Pennsylvania, United States. He was an early graduate of the Curtiss Flying School, where he earned his International Pilot's License (FAI #105) on March 20, 1912. In March 2011, an article published in the Air & Space/Smithsonian touched off a controversy over whether Emory was "the First Licensed Black Aviator."

Early life

Emory was born in Northumberland County, Pennsylvania, the third of six children born to Darius Malick, a carpenter from the same area, and Susan Conrad. Emory's mother died when he was five, and his father remarried shortly thereafter. By 1900, Emory was living on his own as a farm laborer. In 1910, he appears in both Lancaster, Pennsylvania and Philadelphia, Pennsylvania as a carpenter, like his father. With his father, Darius Malick, Emory helped build the capitol building in Harrisburg, as well as installing the mahogany veneering in the Pennsylvania Railroad dining and sleeping cars. In 1911, Mr. Malick became the first aviator to fly over central Pennsylvania, flying his homemade "aeroplane" over both Northumberland and Snyder Counties. On March 20, 1912, at the age of 30, Emory Conrad Malick became the first black pilot to earn an international pilot's license.

Aviation career

The first record of Emory Malick's interest in aviation is July 22, 1911 when Emory is recorded as building a biplane in Seven Points, Northumberland County, Pennsylvania, where he would be attempting a flight that afternoon. His first successful flight in an engine-powered "aeroplane" was on July 24, 1911. Emory sought more formal flying training and in January 1912, Emory C. Malick of Philadelphia was enrolled in the Curtiss Aviation School in San Diego, California. Emory passed his flying test on 20 March 1912, and was awarded his international FAI (Federation Aeronautique Internationale) license #105 at the school, issued by the Aero Club of America. Emory Conrad Malick was now the first known licensed black pilot in the world. Glenn Curtiss declared him to be one of "the best flyers ever turned out by this school."

Emory C. Malick continued to appear regularly in the newspapers from 1914 through 1928. During this time, he is recorded as flying in central Pennsylvania, where he was the first aviator to fly over both Northumberland and Snyder Counties. He also worked in the Delaware Valley, flying out of airfields in Philadelphia and Camden Counties. In 1927, the first year that federal aviation licenses were issued, Mr. Malick became the first African American pilot to earn a Federal Transport License, #1716, as well as a Federal Mechanics License, #924. These licenses were issued through the Aeronautics Branch of the Department of Commerce (later the FAA), and were required for his ongoing work as a pilot for the Aero Service Corporation as well as Dallin Aerial Surveys. He also ran his Flying Dutchman Air Service with pilot and mechanic Ernest Buehl on the weekends.

On 4 March 1928, Mr. Malick took off from Crescent Airport in Camden with two passengers, when suddenly his engine died. In order to avoid crashing into the crowd of spectators and parked cars beneath him, he was able to bank the plane and crash land on the field, saving his passengers and himself. The headlines read, "Skill and Heroism of Emory C. Malick...Prevents Real Tragedy at Camden Yesterday" (Sunbury Daily Item), "Air Pilot's Skill Saves 3 in Crash" (Trenton Evening Times), and "Pilot Malick Saves Himself and Spectators in Making Heroic Landing" (Philadelphia Inquirer). The following 20 May, after years of successful flying, Mr. Malick suffered severe injuries in another crash, this one near Woodbury, NJ, where his passenger was killed. Sabotage? Perhaps. Due to the injury to his eyes, Emory Malick was grounded, and his transport licensed revoked.

That August, Mr. Malick, still on crutches, attended the dedication of the Sunbury Airport, where he displayed his first aeroplane engine. According to the Sunbury Daily Item, "Unsung and unheralded...was the man who was the first to play a plane over the city. Mr. Malick...came to Sunbury by train to attend the dedication of the local airport but was not called upon last night in the introduction of the air luminaries although he was probably the one deserving of highest honor...The Sunbury native is one of the real pioneers of aviation and boasts of 3000 flying hours, ranking him among the foremost of the country."

Race question

The Air & Space/Smithsonian published an article entitled "The Unrecognized First" in March 2011 suggesting Emory was the First Licensed black aviator. The claim was made by his great niece, Mary Groce, based on Malick family photos, records, interviews, and historical documents, which showed him to be a black man. According to the article, "Aileen looked at the paper and replied,
'Oh my God. He's black.'" Further commentary included, "this explains my brother's blond afro." No further evidence was provided, but none was needed. Ms. Groce is the granddaughter of Emory Malick's white-skinned sister, Annie Malick McCormick Groce, who was separated from her birth family as a young child, and who kept the family's African heritage a secret from her grandchildren, but wisely saved all the family records, as did her children, including Ms. Groce's father. The descendant innocently said, "I was never told about Emory or my mixed heritage", which was true at the time of the interview.

Since that time, there have been several prominent endorsements of Emory being the First Licensed Black Aviator, and Mary Groce has written two children's books about her great uncle, "Lila Tells the Story of Emory Conrad Malick, Our First Licensed Black Pilot," and "Aunt Cora's Wart, An Historical Faerie Tale: Nipper Fest!" Both books relate the recently revealed history and family lore about her Uncle Emory. She is currently writing Mr. Malick's biography. Since discovering information about her Uncle Emory, Ms. Groce has learned that, yes, he was indeed listed as white in public records, as were most members of mixed families at that time, in Pennsylvania as well as in several other states, especially when the mother was regarded as white.
Following is a list of some examples of prominent groups sharing the history of Emory Conrad Malick:

 Federal Aviation Administration Tweet honoring Emory Malick as first black person with a pilot's license in the United States
 United States Department of Veterans Affairs, Pittsburgh honoring Emory Malick as first African American to receive a pilot's license
 National Transportation Safety Board, Remarks to the Aero Club, February 26, 2015
 African American Registry, America's First Black Aviator, Emory Malick
 Glenn Curtiss Mansion mentions him training America's first licensed African-American aviator, Emory Conrad Malick

Since that time, a controversy has surrounded the claim that Emory Malick is
actually entitled to the honor of "First Licensed Black Aviator" because of the public records. Photos and records of Emory C. Malick, as well as those of his paternal aunt, Alice Malick, reveal them to be black members of a mixed African- and European-American family. Most of their family passed as white, but Emory and Alice did not, and they were treated accordingly by both their family and their peers.

In 2014, black aviation historian Guy E Franklin released a book entitled "Emory Conrad Malick: A Closer Look"
.
The author collected and presented many source documents to which showed that
Emory was actually white, and hence not entitled to the claim of "First
Licensed Black Aviator." Guy's conclusion
was that all of the available documents showed that he was white and none
suggested otherwise. However, many of Mr. Franklin's claims are based on falsehoods, twisted facts, and erroneous conjecture. None of Ms. Groce's three detractors—Mr. Franklin and two of Mary's very distant, white-skinned Conrad cousins—ever examined primary source material or tried in any way to research Mr. Malick, other than to consult public records available on the internet.

Among the public records suggesting that Emory was white are his draft registration
cards from World War I in 1917

and World War II in 1942

.
The first describes him as white, brown hair, and blue eyes. The latter describes him as white, ruddy complexion, brown hair, and blue eyes. Since the contemporaneous documents match each other, show he was white, and were signed by a witness all add credence to support that Emory was white.

Other documents attesting to Emory Malick being white include:

 Emory's membership in the Independent Order of Odd Fellows, May 3, 1917 (a white-only organization at that time)
 Emory's listing in the 1900, 1910 and 1920 census records as white
 Emory's Pennsylvania death certificate, signed December 24, 1959, lists him as white

Emory's extended family

In addition, the following documents attest to Emory's extended family identifying and being recorded as white:

 Emory's paternal grandparents Daniel and Lavina: white in 1850, 1860, 1870, and 1880 census
 Emory's maternal grandparents William and Anna: white in 1840, 1850, 1860, and 1870 census
 Emory's father Darius: white in 1860, 1870, 1880, 1900, 1910, 1920, and 1930 census, death certificate
 Emory's mother Susan: white in 1860, 1870, and 1880 census
 Emory's older brother Nelson: white in death certificate, 1880, 1900, 1910, 1920, 1930, and 1940 census, World War I draft (blue eyes, brown hair), World War II draft (sallow complexion, blue eyes, gray hair), death certificate
 Emory's older sister Cordelia: white in 1880 census (died young)
 Emory's younger sister Laura: white in 1900, 1910, 1920, and 1930 census
 Emory's younger sister Cora: white in 1918 death certificate

In October 2017, members of the Conrad family, distant relatives of Emory's white mother, created a web page

highlighting Emory's aviation exploits as well as providing source documents on
his family's background. On October 18, 2017, an article appeared in the Sunbury American entitled
"Emory Conrad Malick, Sunbury's First Aviator and Controversial Claims"

highlighting the evidence contradicting the claims that Emory was black. Both Ms. Thomas and Mr. Conrad are Mr. Malick's and Ms. Groce's distant white-skinned Conrad relatives, who are committed to the erroneous belief that they could not possibly have any mixed heritage or be related to anyone who does.

References

External links
Emory Conrad Malick research website
Mary Groce's website on Emory Conrad Malick

1881 births
1959 deaths
Aviators from Pennsylvania
Aviation pioneers
People from Northumberland County, Pennsylvania